MiniTool Partition Wizard is a partition management program for hard disk drives developed by MiniTool Solution.

The 'free' version cannot save any of the data that the software may find.

From version 12 all free features has been removed.

References

External links 
 

Utility software

Utilities for Windows 
Disk partitioning software 
Disk partitions